Jessica Chastain is an American actress of film, television and stage. As a final-year student at the Juilliard School, she was signed on for a talent holding deal by the television producer John Wells. From 2004 to 2010, she had guest roles in television shows, including ER, Veronica Mars, and Law & Order: Trial by Jury. She also appeared in stage productions with Michelle Williams for The Cherry Orchard in 2004, and with Al Pacino for Salome in 2006. In 2008, Chastain made her film debut as the title character in the drama Jolene. She had a minor role in Stolen (2009), a critically panned mystery-thriller, following which she played the younger version of Helen Mirren's character in the action thriller film The Debt (2010).

The year 2011 proved a breakthrough for Chastain. Among her six film releases that year, she starred with Brad Pitt in The Tree of Life, an experimental drama from Terrence Malick, and portrayed an aspiring socialite in 1960s America in the drama The Help. For the latter, Chastain received her first Academy Award nomination, in the supporting actress category. In 2012, she voiced Gia in the $747 million-grossing animated film Madagascar 3: Europe's Most Wanted. She also played a CIA analyst in Kathryn Bigelow's thriller Zero Dark Thirtya partly fictionalized account of the manhunt for Osama bin Ladenwhich garnered her a nomination for Academy Award for Best Actress. Also in 2012, Chastain made her Broadway debut in a revival of The Heiress, playing a naive young girl who becomes a powerful woman. 

In 2013, Chastain starred in the horror film Mama, and played an unhappily married woman in Ned Benson's three-part drama film, collectively titled The Disappearance of Eleanor Rigby. Chastain's biggest live-action commercial successes came in the next two years with the science fiction films Interstellar (2014) and The Martian (2015), both of which grossed over $600 million worldwide. In the former, directed by Christopher Nolan, she played a scientist, and in the latter, directed by Ridley Scott, she played an astronaut alongside Matt Damon. Chastain went on to play strong-willed titular protagonists in the political thriller Miss Sloane (2016), the historical drama The Zookeeper's Wife (2017), and the crime film Molly's Game (2017). In 2019, Chastain played the adult Beverly Marsh in the horror sequel It Chapter Two. In 2021, she starred in the HBO miniseries Scenes from a Marriage, and produced and starred as the televangelist Tammy Faye in the biopic The Eyes of Tammy Faye. For the latter, she won the Academy Award for Best Actress.

Film

Television

Stage

Music video

Virtual reality

See also
List of awards and nominations received by Jessica Chastain

Footnotes

References

External links
 
 

Filmography
Actress filmographies
American filmographies